Reece Lyon (born 13 March 2000) is a Scottish footballer who plays for Annan Athletic, on loan from Greenock Morton, as a midfielder.

Club career
Lyon came through the Greenock Morton youth academy after signing from St Mirren in 2013. He made his debut in the Scottish Challenge Cup against Dumbarton in August 2018. Lyon scored on his first start for the club: scoring the winning goal against Queen of the South.

Lyon was loaned to Annan Athletic in September 2022.

Career statistics

Honours
SPFL Development League West: Winners (2) 2015-16, 2017-18

References

External links

  

2000 births
St Mirren F.C. players
Association football midfielders
Greenock Morton F.C. players
Living people
Scottish footballers
Scottish Professional Football League players
Footballers from Greenock
Annan Athletic F.C. players